This Digital Ocean is an Australian synthpop band.

Biography 
Originally formed in the early 1990s in Melbourne This Digital Ocean composed of Ross Healy, Simon Bowley and Tristan Upton who were all friends of electronic music. TDO released 2 albums with German "Machinery Records". The releases were "Digital Mysticism" and "Trinity 3000". Renowned for their dynamic visual on stage performances, the trio supplemented their live show line up with the addition of Andy Healy on electronic drums and percussion.

Bowley went to work for Lisa Gerrard. Some of the musical projects that he worked on were Whale rider (movie score) & Immortal Memory.

Ross Healy went on to record under the alias Amnesia for S.O.U.R, UK Drum N Bass label and as Cray for French label Bip Hop records. He also teamed up with Bowley to release an album for Australian Creative Records as 56k.

Australian electronic musicians